Attorney General Brown may refer to:

Cecil Brown (Hawaii politician) (1850–1917), Attorney General of the Kingdom of Hawaii
Francis Shunk Brown (1858–1940), Attorney General of Pennsylvania
George M. Brown (1864–1934), Attorney General of Oregon
James Drysdale Brown (1850–1922), Attorney-General of Victoria
James M. Brown (attorney) (born 1941), Attorney General of Oregon
James S. Brown (1824–1878), Attorney General of Wisconsin
Jerry Brown (born 1938), Attorney General of California
Norris Brown (1863–1960), Attorney General of Nebraska
Pat Brown (1905–1996), Attorney General of California
Paul W. Brown (1915–2000), Attorney General of Ohio
Roland Brown (fl. 1960s), Attorney General of Tanzania
Rufus E. Brown (1854–1920), Attorney General of Vermont
Thomas Watters Brown (1879–1944), Attorney-General for Ireland
Vincent Brown (lawyer) (1855–1904), Attorney-General of Trinidad and Tobago
William J. Brown (Ohio politician) (1940–1999), Attorney General of Ohio

See also
Lois Browne-Evans (1927–2007), Attorney-General of Bermuda
General Brown (disambiguation)